New Land: A Novel for Boys and Girls is a children's novel by Sarah Lindsay Schmidt. It was first published in 1933, and it was a Newbery Medal Honor recipient in 1934.

The novel is about a family moving out from Chicago to work on a farm in rural Wyoming in the 1930s.

References

1933 children's books
1933 American novels
American children's novels
Newbery Honor-winning works
Novels set in Wyoming